Hat in the Ring may refer to:

 "Throw one's hat in the ring", a challenger in boxing or campaign announcement in politics
 "Hat in the Ring", the motto of the 94th Fighter Squadron of the United States Air Force